The Opel Tigra name has been applied to two different cars engineered and produced by the German automaker Opel, both based on different iterations of the Corsa supermini, the first built in Spain, the second in France. The first Tigra was a small 2+2 coupé, produced from 1994 to 2000. The later compact hard topped convertible roadster model was introduced in May 2004.

The Tigra was sold in the United Kingdom as the Vauxhall Tigra, in Australia as the Holden Tigra, and was sold in Brazil, Argentina and Mexico as the Chevrolet Tigra.

Tigra A (1994–2000)

The first Tigra was based on the coupé concept car of the same name that was shown at the 1993 Frankfurt Motor Show, alongside an open top Tigra Roadster concept and the Scamp off roader/pickup. The première of the concept Tigra in the United Kingdom was in October 1993, at the London Motorfair.

The Tigra was built on the platform of the second generation Opel Corsa. The production vehicle was introduced in the beginning of 1994, and was built at Opel's Zaragoza plant in Spain. Production commenced in September 1994. General Motors' Pontiac division had considered importing the Tigra to the United States, but in the end it was determined that the car was too small for American consumers. Television advertisements in the United Kingdom for the (Vauxhall) Tigra featured the tune "Fiesta" by The Pogues.

The Tigra shared no body panels with the Corsa on which it was based, and the interior layout was different, however still kept the Corsa dashboard and most major engine parts. The Tigra also included a 2+2 seating arrangement. Due to the coupé styling and compact dimensions of the car, rear seat space was limited.

Both were DOHC 16 valve engines with electronic fuel injection.

The smaller engine was available with an optional four-speed automatic gearbox. The 1.6-litre model came with front fog lights as standard, a feature unavailable on the 1.4-litre version. An automatic option for the 1.4 was added in February 1995.

The suspension was essentially unchanged from the Corsa donor model, although the setup had been tweaked by Lotus.

The car was imported by GM and sold as the Chevrolet Tigra in Brazil and Mexico, and as the Vauxhall Tigra in the United Kingdom. The Brazilian Chevrolet Tigra was imported only for a few months, between the end of 1998 to the beginning of 1999, due to a sudden depreciation of the real, which forced General Motors do Brasil to end importation. The 15" wheels were also exchanged for more affordable 14" wheels.

Production ended in July 2001, with the final sale number worldwide being 256,392. In Germany, from 1994 to 2001, 59,462 models of the car were sold.

Tigra TwinTop B (2004–2009)

After an absence of three years, Opel resurrected the nameplate Tigra in June 2004, for a new sports car based on the third generation Opel Corsa. The Tigra TwinTop, as it was called in markets of Opel, was a two-seater coupé convertible with a retractable hardtop, in the fashion of the Peugeot 206 CC.

It was launched at the Geneva Motor Show in March 2004, and was produced by French coachbuilder Heuliez. Sales commenced in October 2004. Like its predecessor, the Tigra TwinTop was available with two petrol powered engines.

An economic version, which used Fiat's Multijet 1.3 diesel engine, was introduced in 2005.

The second generation was marketed in Australia as the XC series Holden Tigra, only with the 1.8 L engine. Production ended in May 2009, with the final production number being 90,874.

Safety

References

External links

The European TwinTop communities startpage
Opel Tigra Twin Top B, All About Cars, 2016

Tigra
2000s cars
Front-wheel-drive sports cars
Cars introduced in 1994
Hardtop convertibles
Coupés
Roadsters
Euro NCAP roadster sports cars